Clara Sophia Jessup Bloomfield-Moore (February 16, 1824 – January 5, 1899) was an American philanthropist and philosopher.

Biography
She was born in Westfield, Massachusetts. 
She married businessman Bloomfield Haines Moore (1819-1878) and resided in Philadelphia from the date of her marriage onward. Following the death of her husband she moved to London, where she eventually died in 1899. She organized in Philadelphia a hospital relief committee during the American Civil War and assisted in the foundation of the Temperance Home for Children.

She and her husband had three children: Ella Carlton Moore (1843–1892), Clarence Bloomfield Moore (1852–1936), Lilian Stuart Moore (1853–1911). They were the grandparents of Swedish explorer and ethnographer Eric von Rosen.

Philanthropy
Among her philanthropic efforts Clara made additional provision to the Jessup Fund established in 1860 by the bequest of her father Augustus E. Jessup. This fund was originally for the purpose of compensating young men to work directly with curatorial staff at the Academy of Natural Sciences of Philadelphia. Clara added to the fund to ensure women were offered the same opportunity.

Philosophy
Her books on etiquette connected the perennial philosophy to social behavior; for instance, she described harmony as the basis of good manners: "the secret or essence of good manners, as of goodness in all other things, consists in suitableness, or in other words of harmony." She promoted a "science of social intercourse" consisting of "the means through which people meet each other, maintaining harmony and peace in their relations, and securing the greatest possible amount of pleasure and comfort to all." This philosophy was subsequently applied to physics. Her book on ether was written because she believed that ether could account for the operation of the motor invented by John Ernst Worrell Keely, to whose Keely Motor Company she gave liberally in order that he might develop his idea.

Selected works
 Miscellaneous Poems (1875) 
 On Dangerous Ground (1876), a romance 
 Sensible Etiquette (1878) 
 Ether the True Protoplasm (1885) 
 Social Ethics and Social Duties (1892)

References

Attribution

External links

 
 
 More of her publications

1824 births
1899 deaths
American romantic fiction writers
19th-century American poets
Writers from Philadelphia
American women poets
Women romantic fiction writers
19th-century American women writers
People associated with the Philadelphia Museum of Art
19th-century American philanthropists